The Rapid Action Force (RAF) is a specialised wing of the Central Reserve Police Force of India to deal with riot and crowd control situations.

History 
RAF was raised on 11 December 1991 with headquarters in New Delhi. It became fully operational on 7 October 1992, to deal with riots, riot like situations, crowd control, rescue and relief operations, and related unrest. The first five battalions were raised by October 1992 and an additional 5 battalions were added in April 1994. In October 2003, with 11 years of service, the force was presented with the President's colours. On 9 November 2013, the RAF Academy of Public Order was established in Meerut, Uttar Pradesh. In 2017, the Indian government approved an additional five battalions to be based in New Delhi, Haryana, Rajasthan, Uttar Pradesh and Bihar.

Organization
RAF is commanded by an Inspector-General of Police (IGP), functioning at New Delhi. The RAF is divided into two ranges headed by a DIGP at New Delhi and Mumbai. The RAF has a distinctive uniform with a blue-coloured camouflage pattern which symbolizes peace. Its motto is "Serving Humanity with Sensitive Policing".

It currently has 15 specialized trained and equipped battalions, which are numbered 83, 91, 97, 99 to 108, 114 and 194 in the CRPF. Each battalion is headed by a Commanding Officer (CO), an officer of the rank of Commandant. The RAF Battalions of CRPF are located at
the following places:

Team is the smallest independent functional unit of the force and is commanded by an Inspector. Each team has three components, namely riot control, tear some and fire. Each company of RAF has one team composed of women personnel to deal with women demonstrators.

The force is equipped with non-lethal weapons for dispersing the crowd with minimum harm and losses. It is always kept in readiness for rapid deployment when the situation so demands and are only deployed by the orders of Ministry of Home Affairs on specific demands from state governments for a short duration.

Role

Riot and crowd control
This unit has been used to deal with communal violence, law and order duty, festival and election duties and agitation.

United Nations Peace Keeping Operations
The CRPF female and male contingents under the arrangements of RAF are deployed in United Nations Mission in Liberia (UNMIL), Monrovia and Zwedru in UN Peacekeeping mission since 2007–08. CRPF Female Formed Police Unit was the first of its kind in the world, which was deployed under the aegis of UN Peace Keeping Mission.

Humanitarian activities

RAF has also succeeded in projecting the human face of the Government and built bridges with the public by carrying out prompt rescue and relief operations during floods, earthquakes, cyclones and outbreak of epidemics in various parts of the country.

Anti-terror operations
During the November 2008 Mumbai Terror Attacks, RAF was involved in cordoning the areas around the Oberoi Trident and the Taj Mahal hotels. Kamlesh Kumari of the 88 Mahila Battalion was posthumously awarded the Ashoka Chakra for her bravery during the 2001 Indian Parliament attack.

References

Government agencies established in 1992
Specialist law enforcement agencies of India
Federal law enforcement agencies of India
1991 establishments in Delhi